Jane Bahk is a children book author who is the writer of Juna's Jar.

Personal life 
She was born in Toronto, Canada. She is a former school teacher. Her parents immigrated from Korea.

Awards 

 Asian/Pacific American Award for Literature for Picture Book in 2015-2016
 New Voices Award in 2010

Works 

 Juna's Jar
 Juna and Appa

References 

Year of birth missing (living people)
Living people
Canadian women children's writers
Canadian writers of Asian descent
Writers from Toronto
Canadian people of Korean descent
21st-century Canadian women writers
Canadian schoolteachers
20th-century Canadian educators